Cryptolechia olivaria is a moth in the family Depressariidae. It was described by Wang in 2006. It is found in Zhejiang, China.

The length of the forewings is about 14.5 mm. The forewings are pale yellow, with light brown scales and with small brown dots at the middle of the cell, the end of the cell and three-fifths of the fold. There is a series of tiny brown dots from near the apex along the termen to the tornus.

Etymology
The species name refers to the costa of the valva bearing a hairy olive-shaped process basally and is derived from Latin olivarius (meaning relating to olives).

References

Moths described in 2006
Cryptolechia (moth)